The Frost Farm is a historic farmstead at 18 Fairwood Drive in Dublin, New Hampshire, United States. Built in 1855 and extensively restyled in 1910, it is a good example of a Georgian Revival summer house, with expansive views of nearby Mount Monadnock. The property was listed on the National Register of Historic Places in 1983. It is now home to the Fairwood Bible Institute.

Description and history
The former Frost Farm property is located in a rural setting west of Dublin Pond, on the north side of Old Marlborough west of Charcoal Road. It is a rambling -story wood-frame structure, with a clapboarded exterior and a variety of rooflines. Covered porches line some portions of the building, and some of its roofs are pierced by rows of gabled dormers. The property includes a number of later 20th-century outbuildings, including a chapel and barns.

The oldest portion of this farmstead was a vernacular rectangular farmhouse built c. 1855 by Silas Frost. In 1910 it was transformed into a much larger Georgian Revival summer house by Charles Aldworth, under the auspices of architects Densmore, LeClear and Robinson of Boston, Massachusetts. It was for two seasons the residence of the polar explorer, Admiral Richard E. Byrd. In 1951 it was acquired by The Kingdom Inc., which adapted it for its present use as a bible study school.

See also
National Register of Historic Places listings in Cheshire County, New Hampshire

External links
Fairwood Bible Institute

References

Houses on the National Register of Historic Places in New Hampshire
Colonial Revival architecture in New Hampshire
Houses completed in 1855
Houses in Dublin, New Hampshire
National Register of Historic Places in Dublin, New Hampshire